Stéphane Rousseau (born September 17, 1966) is a Canadian actor and comedian. He starred in the Academy Award-winning film The Barbarian Invasions. He has also been in Asterix at the Olympic Games (2008). His latest movies is the French comedy Fatal, a Zoolander-type spoof of the music industry focusing on the character Fatal Bazooka created by Michaël Youn.

In 2021 he was one of the panelists on Chanteurs masqués, the Quebec adaptation of the Masked Singer franchise.

Personal life
He and ex-wife Maud Saint-Germain share a son, Axel Saint-Germain-Rousseau, born on December 25, 2008.

Filmography

References

External links
 

1966 births
Living people
Canadian male film actors
French Quebecers
Best Supporting Actor Genie and Canadian Screen Award winners
Male actors from Montreal
People from LaSalle, Quebec